The Didymellaceae are a family of fungi in the order Pleosporales. The have a world-wide distribution.

Recent phylogenetic examination of some of the larger genera of the Pleosporales, particularly Phoma, has led to considerable reorganisation of the order, many of the species being placed in this family.

It was originally described including the genera Atradidymella, Boeremia, Chaetopyrena, Didymella, Endophoma, Leptosphaerulina, Macroventuria, Peyronellaea, Phoma, Platychora and Stagonosporopsis.

Atradidymella is now placed within Pleosporales order, and Endophoma (is unplaced).

Taxonomy
Genera as accepted by GBIF;
 Allophoma  (14)
 Amerodothis (3)
 Ascochyta  (819)
 Ascochytella  (14)
 Ascochytula  (6)
 Basiascella (1)
 Boeremia  (26)
 Calophoma  (19)
 Cerebella  (5)
 Chaetasbolisia  (7)
 Chaetopyrena  (6)
 Chlamydosporium  (1)
 Deuterophoma (3)
 Didymella  (343)
 Didymellocamarosporium (1)
 Didysimulans (2)
 Epicoccum  (98)
 Extrusothecium  (2)
 Heterophoma  (7)
 Juxtiphoma  (3)
 Leptophoma (1)
 Leptosphaerulina  (56)
 Macroventuria  (2)
 Neoascochyta  (22)
 Neodidymella (1)
 Neodidymelliopsis (11)
 Neomicrosphaeropsis (10)
 Nothophoma (14)
 Paraboeremia  (12)
 Paratrichaegum (1)
 Peyronellaea  (21)
 Phaeomycocentrospora  (2)
 Phoma  (1k)
 Phomatodes  (3)
 Piggotia (9)
 Pithomyces  (44)
 Platychora  (1)
 Polyopeus  (1)
 Pseudoascochyta (2)
 Scheleobrachea (1)
 Sclerochaeta (1)
 Sclerophomella  (3)
 Sclerophomina (1)
 Scleropleella  (1)
 Similiphoma (1)
 Stagonosporopsis  (44)
 Stemphyliomma (2)
 Vacuiphoma (2)
 Vandijckomycella  (2)
 Xenodidymella  (7)

Figures in brackets are approx. how many species per genus.

References

Bibliography
 
 Zhang Y, Schoch CL, Fournier J, Crous PW, Gruyter J De, Woudenberg JHC, Hirayama K, Tanaka K, Pointing SB, Hyde KD. 2009. Multi-locus phylogeny of the Pleosporales: a taxonomic, ecological and evolutionary re-evaluation. Studies in Mycology 64: 85–102.

External links

Pleosporales
Dothideomycetes families
Taxa described in 2009